Onwurah is a surname. Notable people with the surname include:

Chi Onwurah (born 1965), British politician
Ngozi Onwurah (born 1966), British-Nigerian film director, producer, model, and lecturer

Surnames of African origin